San Isidro District may refer to:

 Peru
 San Isidro District, Lima, a district of the Lima province
 Costa Rica
 San Isidro District, Alajuela, in Alajuela (canton), Alajuela province
 San Isidro District, Atenas, in Atenas (canton), Alajuela province
 San Isidro District, El Guarco, in El Guarco (canton), Cartago province
 San Isidro District, Grecia, in Grecia (canton), Alajuela province
 San Isidro District, León Cortés, in León Cortés (canton), San José province
 San Isidro District, Montes de Oro, in Montes de Oro (canton), Puntarenas province
 San Isidro District, San Isidro, in San Isidro (canton), Heredia province
 San Isidro District, San Ramón, in San Ramón (canton), Alajuela province
 San Isidro, Vázquez de Coronado, in Vázquez de Coronado (canton), San José province
 San Isidro del El General District, in Pérez Zeledón (canton), San José province

District name disambiguation pages